Ronan Glennon (born 1999) is an Irish hurler who plays for Galway Championship club Mullagh and at inter-county level with the Galway senior hurling team.

Career

Glennon first played hurling at juvenile and underage levels with Mullagh before eventually joining the club's senior team. He simultaneously lined out as a schoolboy with St Brigid's College in Loughrea and later with the Galway-Mayo Institute of Technology. Glennon first lined out at inter-county level during a two-year stint with the Galway minor hurling team. He lined out at right wing-back when Galway beat Cork in the 2017 All-Ireland minor final.	 Glennon later spent a season with the Galway under-20 hurling team before joining the senior team in advance of the 2022 National League.

Career statistics

Honours

Galway
All-Ireland Minor Hurling Championship: 2017

References

1999 births
Living people
Mullagh hurlers
Galway inter-county hurlers